Quam Heights is a mostly snow-covered heights, 15 miles (24 km) long and 4 miles (6 km) wide, rising over 1,000 m and forming the coastline between the Barnett and Dennistoun Glaciers in northern Victoria Land, Antarctica.

Mapped by United States Geological Survey (USGS) from surveys and U.S. Navy aerial photography, 1960–63. The site was named by the Advisory Committee on Antarctic Names (US-ACAN) for Louis O. Quam, chief scientist of the National Science Foundation's Office of Polar Programs, 1967–72.

Mountains of Victoria Land
Pennell Coast